Joseph Alzin (18 December 1893 – 2 September 1930) was a Luxembourgish weightlifter, competing at the Summer Olympics for Luxembourg in 1920 and the 1924 Summer Olympics. He was born in Paris and died in Marseille. He won the silver medal at the 1920 Olympics in the heavyweight (+82.5 kg) weightlifting.

References

External links
 
 

1893 births
1930 deaths
Sportspeople from Paris
Luxembourgian male weightlifters
Olympic weightlifters of Luxembourg
Olympic silver medalists for Luxembourg
Olympic medalists in weightlifting
Weightlifters at the 1920 Summer Olympics
Weightlifters at the 1924 Summer Olympics
Medalists at the 1920 Summer Olympics